World Team Chess Championship 1985 – is a chess event, which took place from 15 to 28 November 1985.

Participating teams

Rosters

Results by round

Crosstable

Individual score

References

Chess competitions
1985 in chess